Bernadette Amani Kakounan (born 5 September 1997) is an Ivorian footballer who plays as a midfielder for Spanish Primera Federación club FF La Solana and the Ivory Coast women's national team.

Club career
Kakounan signed with Spanish Primera Nacional club Extremadura UD on 29 September 2019.

See also
List of Ivory Coast women's international footballers

References

1997 births
Living people
People from Gôh-Djiboua District
Ivorian women's footballers
Women's association football midfielders
Extremadura UD Femenino players
Segunda Federación (women) players
Ivory Coast women's international footballers
Ivorian expatriate footballers
Ivorian expatriate sportspeople in Spain
Expatriate women's footballers in Spain